Robin Holcomb is the second album by Robin Holcomb, released on November 19, 1990, through Elektra Records.

Track listing

Personnel 
Musicians
Danny Frankel – drums, percussion
Bill Frisell – guitar, acoustic guitar
David Hofstra – bass guitar, acoustic bass guitar, tuba
Robin Holcomb – vocals, piano
Wayne Horvitz – organ, synthesizer, piano, harmonica, production
Doug Wieselman – clarinet, tenor saxophone, guitar, acoustic Guitar 
Production and additional personnel
John Caulfield – violin and mandolin on "Troy" and "Yr Mother Called Them Farmhouses"
Marion Ettlinger – photography
Jay Follette – engineering
Lenny Kaye – production on "Hand Me Down All Stories"
Bob Ludwig – mastering
Manhattan Design – design

References

External links 
 

1990 albums
Elektra Records albums
Robin Holcomb albums